1 year may refer to:

2008, the year, or any year ending with 08
August, the month
8 (number)
40, the telephone area code for Stockholm
08, the number of the French department Ardennes
08, the area code for Oulu, Finland 
The telephone area code for South Australia, Western Australia and Northern Territory

See also
 O8 (disambiguation)